The Wilhelm Busch Prize is an biennial poetry award for 10,000 €, for humorous and satirical verse, administered by the Schaumburger Landschaft, named after Wilhelm Busch. An additional award by the organization is the Hans Huckebein Prize, former Wilhelm-Busch-Förderpreis.

Recipients
 2006 Robert Gernhardt
 2007 Vicco von Bülow, "Loriot"
 2008 F. W. Bernstein
 2011 Ernst Kahl
 2013 Franziska Becker
 2015 Hans Traxler
 2017 Ralf König
 2019 Isabel Kreitz
 2021 Markus Witzel alias

Hans Huckebein Prize
former Wilhelm-Busch-Förderpreis

References

External links
 

Poetry awards